TGIF was an American prime time television programming block that has aired on ABC at various points since the late 1980s. The name comes from the initials of the popular phrase "Thank God It's Friday"; however, the stars of the lineup touted the initialism meaning "Thank Goodness It's Funny." In its various incarnations, the block mainly featured situation comedies aimed at a family audience, and served as a lead-in to the long-running newsmagazine 20/20 (which has been part of ABC's Friday night schedule since September 1987, two years prior to the original launch of TGIF).

The block initially premiered on September 22, 1989, marking one of the first attempts by a major network to brand a programming block (a concept that was concurrently becoming popular among cable networks at the time of its inception), with the goal of encouraging young viewers to watch the entire lineup, instead of just a particular show. The "TGIF" block dominated the ratings in the 18–49 demographic for most of the 1990s. However, ratings began declining during the latter half of the decade due partly to Fridays becoming more common for social outings among segments of the block's key demographic as well as the loss and aging quality of many of the lineup's signature shows, culminating in the original incarnation ending after eleven years on September 8, 2000.

ABC revived the "TGIF" brand on September 26, 2003, with its second run lasting only two seasons, ending on September 15, 2005. On May 15, 2018, the network announced that it would revive the block, with the third incarnation, which has launched on October 5, 2018. This newest incarnation of TGIF consisted of a mix of sitcoms and game shows. The incarnation was short-lived, with the block ending for the third time on September 27, 2019.

History

ABC Friday-night legacy: 1950s to 1970s
Family-friendly comedies, which featured families with children as major characters, were a staple of ABC's programming dating back to the network's earlier sitcoms from the 1950s onward, such as The Adventures of Ozzie and Harriet (which premiered in 1952), Leave It to Beaver (which moved to ABC in 1958, after spending its first season on CBS), The Donna Reed Show (which premiered in 1958), The Flintstones (which premiered in 1960, but was largely an adult-oriented animated comedy until the birth of Pebbles in 1963), The Brady Bunch (which premiered in 1969), and The Partridge Family (which premiered in 1970; that series and The Brady Bunch became part of the Friday night lineup at that time).

Jim Janicek
TGIF was created and executive produced by Jim Janicek. Prior to the official launch of the block, Janicek was employed as a writer and producer for ABC Entertainment, who was in charge of promoting the network's Tuesday- and Friday-night comedy lineups. Recalling his childhood when his family would gather to watch The Wonderful World of Disney, he was inspired to create a family-oriented comedy block. In 1988, Janicek began gaining support for his concept by approaching the studios and talent of independently produced ABC shows, promoting the synergy and potential success of the family block brand. With four ABC family-oriented comedy series on board, and the backing of network president Bob Iger, the initial lineup for the block was created.

Before ABC experienced its success on that night during the 1980s, its Friday night schedule consisted of hit comedies such as Webster (which remained on Fridays until its cancellation by ABC in 1987, only to subsequently be renewed by Paramount Television as a first-run syndicated series), Benson (which would be cancelled at the end of the 1985–86 season) and Diff'rent Strokes (which moved to the network in 1985 after being cancelled after seven seasons by NBC, only to cancelled by ABC following its eighth and final season). The block of predominantly family-friendly situation comedies was inaugurated in the 1988–89 season with three series that were already part of the Friday lineup (Perfect Strangers, Full House and Mr. Belvedere) and a sophomore series new to that night, Just the Ten of Us (a spinoff of Growing Pains, which originally aired on Tuesdays for its abbreviated first season in the spring of 1988).

Since the 1987–88 season, Perfect Strangers stars Mark Linn-Baker and Bronson Pinchot (in character as Larry Appleton and Balki Bartokomous, respectively) had been doing hosted interstitials that were conducted from the Perfect Strangers set, originally airing during the two-hour Wednesday sitcom block that their series was part of as that season began. In March 1988, Perfect Strangers moved to Fridays, and the interstitials went with them. On Fridays, the hosted interstitial concept gained more traction before the family-friendly concept on that night was actually implemented. Pinchot and Linn-Baker would remain the sole hosts of the Friday lineup throughout the 1988–89 season.

Meanwhile, ABC began reformulating its Tuesday night lineup which, for the past several seasons, had consisted of a comedy block from 8:00 to 9:00 p.m. Eastern Time followed by two hour-long dramas, most notably with the hit series Moonlighting airing at 9:00 p.m. Eastern. Moonlighting, then in its fifth season and starting to experience a considerable decline in its ratings (greatly thanks to the 1988 WGA strike, which delayed the premieres of many programs set to launch or return for the 1988 fall season), was placed on a temporary hiatus by ABC in February 1989 when the network decided to add a second hour of comedy offerings onto its Tuesday schedule. Janicek, in response, came up with the idea to promote the restructured lineup under a unified brand name, Terrific Tuesday, to draw audiences to the changes, to reference the two additional sitcoms that were being offered, and especially as a nod to Who's the Boss? and the freshman smash hit Roseanne, which now served as a strong anchor for the expanded comedy lineup.

The Terrific Tuesday branding was a success, and ABC urged Janicek to continue the banner name for the following season. At the time of the network upfronts that unveiled the upcoming fall schedule in May 1989, Janicek, as well as ABC, devised the notion of further promoting their family fun-themed Fridays with a brand name. Over the summer, ABC began promoting the Friday sitcoms under the experimental title, "The Friday Fun Club". While Terrific Tuesday and What-a-Wednesday were both on tap for the 1989–90 fall season, the Friday branding concept was to undergo a revision before September.

First run of TGIF (1989–2000)

TGIF brand debuts

As a result of ABC and Jim Janicek's plan for Friday brand familiarity, definitive changes occurred to the lineup on Friday, September 22, 1989. An opening sequence for the two-hour block was introduced, featuring animated mice against a gray background. The theme music, featuring a male vocalist and a falsetto-tuned backup chorus, sang the lyrics, "Time for fun (thank goodness!)/Time for a good laugh (it's funny!)/Time, time, time, time for fun! (T-T-T-Time!)". The mice held up title cards containing the selected theme lyrics "Thank goodness" and "It's funny!" right in the way of an older mouse.. The sequence concludes with the older mouse breaking a grandfather clock with a mallet, which cut to the hosted interstitial.

For the first time, another show's cast assumed hosting duties for the interstitials in place of the stars of Perfect Strangers. Dave Coulier, John Stamos and Mary-Kate and Ashley Olsen (alternating as Michelle Tanner) all appeared on the set of Full House introducing the season and series premieres that night. As they began their first segment, the TGIF name was officially introduced, in which its meaning, "Thank Goodness It's Funny", was re-emphasized from the theme lyrics. Coulier and Stamos also announced that a new policy, in which stars from the other three TGIF programs would rotate hosting responsibilities along with them on a week-to-week basis, would begin. Rotating with Full House that season were the casts of new arrival Family Matters, Perfect Strangers (whose first night its cast members hosted the Friday lineup under the TGIF banner occurred on October 13, 1989) and Just the Ten of Us. On the premiere night of TGIF, the new (and ultimately short-lived) comedy Free Spirit aired as a preview telecast at 9:30 p.m. Eastern Time, with Just the Ten of Us reclaiming its time slot the following week.

During the inaugural season of the format, the TGIF logo was only featured at the start of every hosted segment, appearing in a design where each letter was encased in a tall gray box (as pictured to the right); the boxes would flip in at the bottom of the screen, stand still for a few seconds, and then turn out. One of the animated mice from the TGIF title sequences was featured on some weeks within the live-action host segments, and was introduced by the actors as the lineup's mascot, known as "Friday the Mouse". Custom bumpers would appear after the final scene of each program, where normally a short cut of the show's title logo and theme would play, denoting the final commercial break.

During the first season of TGIF, the bumpers featured additional animations of the mice, including variants that featured the taller mouse popping out of the grandfather clock, a small mouse being dragged around by a running chainsaw around it, the taller mouse walking towards the grandfather clock, thinking it over, and then backtracking, and the taller mouse popping up from the top and bottom of the screen on both sides of the show's title logo. The official title logo for the respective program (as opposed to the logo designs used mainly in network promotions for each show that were used in the block's bumpers in later years) was displayed on either side of the clock. The closing animation, which ran after the credits of the 9:30 program (usually Just the Ten of Us), consisted of the same theme music, albeit with the lyrics, "See you next week..here for a good laugh", followed by a few instrumental notes. One such animation involved the taller mouse holding what looked like a parade float likeness of himself, as it flies out of control and he flies around with it. Another shows the mouse walking with a blowtorch and mask on, but he doesn't know that the plug comes lose, so he angrily walks back.

Explosive success in the 1990s
With the TGIF moniker permanently in place, more changes in presentation occurred as the lineup grew in popularity. On September 21, 1990, the animated mice opening and accompanying theme music were dropped from the Friday block, in favor of a new graphics package that officially incorporated the new TGIF name for the first time. With these new visuals came the "classic" TGIF theme ("It's Friday night/And the mood is right/Gonna have some fun/Show you how it's done, TGIF.").

For most of TGIFs run until the 1998–99 season, at least one series on the lineup was produced (and in some cases, developed) by the team of Thomas L. Miller and Robert L. Boyett, whose relationship with ABC traces back to the premiere of Love, American Style – produced by Miller and former producing partner Edward K. Milkis under a development deal with Paramount Television – in 1972. The first two series were Perfect Strangers and Full House, both of which were produced through Miller-Boyett's development deal with Lorimar Television (absorbed into Warner Bros. Television in 1993) and aired on the network's Friday night schedule prior to the launch of TGIF. (The latter premiered in September 1987 as part of the network's Friday schedule, while the former concurrently was moved from Wednesdays to Fridays that month.) In September 1989, Family Matters – a spin-off of Perfect Strangers originally centered solely on the family of Harriette Winslow, who began as a recurring character on its parent series, before becoming centered increasingly around the breakout character of Steve Urkel starting with its second season – joined the lineup.

All four TGIF shows featured as part of the block's 1990–91 schedule were produced by Miller-Boyett, with Perfect Strangers, Family Matters and Full House being joined by the short-lived Going Places. Being a more adult-targeted entry in the 9:30/8:30 TGIF slot, Going Places initially lagged behind its sister shows; a mid-season retool, one that placed an equal emphasis on juvenile characters, improved ratings (although Perfect Strangers maintained a similar, virtually exclusive focus on adult characters even after moving to TGIF and had abandoned plans to add child actress Alisan Porter to its cast as a young neighbor to lead characters Balki and Larry after one episode that same season). Going Places was cancelled after one season in spite of its ratings increase, and was replaced in the 1991–92 season by Baby Talk, a sitcom based on the film Look Who's Talking. Baby Talk initially scored high ratings as a mid-season replacement on TGIF in the spring of 1991 (trying out in the Going Places time slot). In its second season, however, ratings collapsed. Also joining the lineup for the 1991–92 season was another Miller-Boyett series, the Brady Bunch-inspired Step by Step (a vehicle for Suzanne Somers and Patrick Duffy, whose cast also included former Going Places co-stars Staci Keanan and Christopher Castile), which went on to become a TGIF mainstay for the next six seasons. (The pickup of Step by Step as well as the renewal of Baby Talk resulted in Full House concurrently being moved off the TGIF lineup to lead ABC's Tuesday comedy block, alongside hit series Roseanne and Coach and freshman hit Home Improvement.)

During the most successful years of TGIF, the main characters of one of the Friday prime-time sitcoms would "host" the two-hour block of episodes for that week. Always in character, they would introduce each show and comment on the proceedings afterward. Sometimes, characters from a series that did not air on the Friday schedule would appear to host. For example, in January 1996, Daniel Hugh Kelly, Betsy Brantley and other stars from the short-lived drama Second Noah served as one-time-only guest hosts of TGIF as a cross promotion for the new Saturday series. Occasionally, the hosts for the evening would find a common thread between each show. During the fall seasons in the late 1980s and early 1990s, casts from various TGIF shows would host Saturday morning preview specials, which outlined much of new programs set to air on the Saturday morning fall schedule (after The Walt Disney Company began programming the network's Saturday morning lineup in 1997, following its prior acquisition of ABC, these preview specials were hosted for the remainer of TGIFs run by the hosts of Disney's One Saturday Morning).

When TGIF officially launched, weekly promos for the lineup were voiced by actor and resident ABC announcer Robert Ridgely, who had mainly been voicing sitcom promos, including those for Fridays, for a few years before the brand was incorporated. Veteran television personality and announcer Gary Owens, who had been with ABC since 1985 as a primetime promo voiceover, became the sole announcer for weekly TGIF promotions beginning with the 1990–91 season. Owens remained as the "voice of TGIF" until the end of the 1994–95 season. Also during the 1990–91 season, TGIF was promoted with a series of trading cards featuring publicity shots featuring the stars of Perfect Strangers, Full House and Family Matters.

After trying out three new series during the 1992–93 season that were canceled either because of poor ratings (Camp Wilder and Where I Live, the latter’s occurring weeks after its October 1993 move to Saturdays for its short-lived second season) or network politics (Getting By), the 1993–94 season saw the additions of three new comedies to the block, two of which would provide some needed stability to the lineup for most of the time up through the 1995–96 season. The first was Boy Meets World, a sitcom from Michael Jacobs (who created Dinosaurs, a Jim Henson-produced live-action comedy about a family of anthropomorphic dinosaurs that aired on TGIF from 1991 to 1993) with similar underlying themes as the then-recently-concluded ABC dramedy The Wonder Years, centering around Cory Matthews (Ben Savage, the younger brother of Wonder Years star Fred Savage) as he navigates life with his family, friends and ever-present teacher and neighbor George Feeny (William Daniels); the series was a breakout ratings success and received favorable reviews from critics for its humor and handling of the complications surrounding the transition from childhood to adulthood.

Moving from Tuesdays for its second season that year was Hangin' with Mr. Cooper, a series from Full House creator Jeff Franklin that debuted in September 1992 as a starring vehicle for comedian Mark Curry, and co-stars Dawnn Lewis (previously of A Different World) and Holly Robinson (previously of 21 Jump Street); the concurrences of Coopers move to Fridays and Lewis’s departure saw it reformat from a series about three adult roommates into more of a family-oriented comedy, with Raven-Symoné, Saundra Quarterman (both playing the cousins of Curry’s character Mark Cooper), Marquise Wilson (who recurred as Cooper’s pre-teen neighbor, Tyler Foster, in its first season) and Nell Carter (playing the principal of the high school where Cooper works as a teacher and coach) joining the main cast. (Longtime Miller-Boyett collaborators William Bickley and Michael Warren, who wrote for Perfect Strangers and created Family Matters, Step by Step and Getting By, would later serve as Coopers showrunners for its last three seasons beginning with the 1994–95 season.) Serving as a Spring replacement for Cooper in 1994 and 1995 was Sister, Sister, starring Tia and Tamera Mowry as identical twins adopted at birth to parents with polar-opposite personalities (Tim Reid and Jackeé Harry) who are reunited during a chance encounter at a clothing store. Despite scoring decent ratings over its two seasons on the network (particularly among teenage viewers), ABC canceled Sister, Sister in May 1995, a few weeks after its second season concluded. (It was subsequently picked up by fledgling “netlet” The WB, where it ran for four additional seasons.)

Summer months
During the first few years of TGIF, the host interstitials varied during the summer months. The regular hosting rotation continued with new segments during the summer of 1990, the final months of the "mice" motif. For the late spring and summer of 1991, ABC decided to relieve the TGIF stars of filming/taping segments from their respective sets. Instead, stars performed voiceovers for "TGIF Trivia", game-like segments made up of episode scenes and multiple-choice questions. The trivia quiz provided "A", "B" and "C" choices of events that the home viewer was supposed to choose from for a supposed "single" correct answer; in reality, all choices were correct in each round, as every scene featured was from an actual episode inclusion. Stars that narrated TGIF Trivia included Heather Locklear (of Going Places), Telma Hopkins (of Family Matters), Jodie Sweetin (of Full House) and Melanie Wilson (of Perfect Strangers).

For the late spring and summer of 1992, ABC ran a promotional contest that chose winners from around the country to host TGIF for a week from their own homes. Those that were chosen were instructed to videotape their own segments from home, giving commentary on the shows that would air on the week they were scheduled to be featured. Families, individuals, groups of friends, couples, and most prominently teenagers were among the winners.

The voiceover narration format from TGIF stars returned for the late spring and summer of 1993. This time, however, a rotation of stars would simply voice previews over upcoming episode scenes. As with the "TGIF Trivia" format in 1991, a single star – among them, Brandon Call (Step By Step) and Jo Marie Payton (Family Matters) – would handle the duties each week. Payton, in particular, had the distinction of having one of the weeks she did segment narrations on August 6, 1993, when Perfect Strangers (where her Family Matters character Harriette Winslow originated) aired its series finale. From 1994 to 1999, original on-camera host segments returned to TGIF for the summer.

Spin-off concepts
In the spring of 1991, with TGIFs meteoric success, ABC president Bob Iger and Senior Vice President of Marketing of ABC Entertainment, Mark Zakaran appointed Jim Janicek to expand his branding work to other portions of the ABC entertainment schedule.

The Hump (1991)
Janicek's first attempt to replicate the success of TGIF came in August 1991, when ABC launched a three-hour comedy block on Wednesday nights for the 1991–92 season. Loosely known as The Hump, via the tagline "Over the hump!" used in advertisements ("Three hours of non-stop laughs are guaranteed to get you over the hump!", "That'll get you over the hump!") and the use of a 1970s funk-flavored background jingle which chanted, "I've got to get over the hump", the format came complete with promos that used a special graphics scheme, differing from TGIF and ABC's nights of regular, non-concept based lineups. The concept title was another play on a popular catchphrase, in which Wednesday is typically referred to as "hump day" (being the middle of the work week, thus making it "over the hump" toward the weekend).

From August to September 1991, the formation of The Hump consisted of The Wonder Years, Growing Pains (in the month leading to its move to Saturday nights), Doogie Howser, M.D., Davis Rules (which had been cancelled in May 1991), Anything but Love and Married People (both of which were cancelled in March 1991), which were all in summer reruns. For the new fall season, the lineup changed to feature Dinosaurs replacing Growing Pains at 8:30 p.m. Eastern Time, new sitcom Sibs at 9:30 p.m., and the new sitcom Good & Evil at 10:30 p.m. The sitcoms that aired between 9:30 and 11:00 (Sibs, Anything but Love and Good & Evil) were separately marketed from the first three programs on The Hump as "comedies made specifically for adults". The "adult" promos for The Hump exclusively featured the funk-styled song, whereas promos for the 8:00–9:30 p.m. shows, and the entire lineup in general, used the instrumental version of the 1991 jingle for ABC's "America's Watching" campaign. Unlike TGIF and its future one-off concept I Love Saturday Night, The Hump did not use hosted interstitials or customized bumpers for the last commercial break of each show.

With the cancellation of Good & Evil in late October, which the network claimed was entirely due to its low ratings in its 10:30 p.m. slot (although many advocacy groups claimed it was due to the controversy surrounding the defamatory portrayal of a blind character), along with the lackluster first-month ratings for Sibs, ABC was convinced that the three-hour comedy block was a failure. The network opted to give the 10:00 p.m. slot on Wednesdays back to an hour-long drama, the upcoming legal series Civil Wars, during November sweeps. The Hump concept aired for the last time on October 30, 1991, and ABC resumed promoting the Wednesday lineup in standard fashion. Sibs went on hiatus, and Anything but Love was moved back into its former 9:30 p.m. Eastern slot on Wednesdays. For the weeks of November 6 and 13, 1991, specials aired in the 10:00 p.m. slot, prior the premiere of Civil Wars on November 20.

MCTV: More Cool TV (1991–93)
At the start of the 1991–92 season, Janicek also brought the hosted programming block format to Saturday mornings, under the title MCTV (More Cool TV). This title indicated that after TGIF on Friday nights, there was "more cool TV" just hours away on Saturday morning; this block ran from September 7, 1991 to January 23, 1993. Live-action stars of the network's Saturday morning lineup, most notably including the cast of ABC's Land of the Lost revival, hosted interstitials every half-hour. The MCTV segments at times were several seconds shorter than those shot for TGIF. While an opening sequence and custom last-segment show bumpers were included, the theme music used was the instrumental version of ABC's 1991 "America's Watching" campaign. The latter music continued as a part of the MCTV scheme in its second year, despite ABC having launched the "It Must Be ABC" image campaign at that time.

Also notably airing on MCTV was the cartoon Hammerman, whose star, MC Hammer, gave even more meaning to the Saturday morning lineup's moniker. Hammer himself appeared as host of MCTV on a few occasions. Hammerman was cancelled by the end of the 1991–92 season. In the fall of 1992, while the MCTV branding continued in use during the Saturday morning schedule, promos for the lineup no longer referenced the "More Cool TV" tagline.

I Love Saturday Night (1992)
Seeing how TGIF dominated prime time on Fridays in the face of typical decreased television viewership on that night, Janicek and company felt that the same marketing power could translate into success for Saturday night. Saturday, as an even heavier social night not spent at home by viewers in the 18–49 demographic, resulted in most networks airing shows with older demographics, those with family appeal, or programs faltering in the ratings on other nights (or in the most political cases, shows that a network no longer has confidence in). NBC had claimed dominant victory on Saturday nights throughout the 1980s and into the 1990s, with an eclectic mix of family-themed shows and sophisticated comedies aimed at an older audience (such as The Golden Girls, 227, Amen and Empty Nest). ABC, however, had continued to struggle on Saturday nights. Through the end of the 1990–91 television season, recent programs such as The ABC Mystery Movie and China Beach had experienced a quick death after moving to Saturdays, leading to such bold decisions as moving the nationwide phenomenon Twin Peaks to Saturday in order to shore up the lineup. After reformatting the Saturday night lineup for the 1991 fall schedule to include an hour of comedy followed by another established drama and a freshman drama, ABC announced plans for a Saturday TGIF offshoot to premiere at mid-season.

Titled I Love Saturday Night, it launched to provide a new night and time for three of ABC's aging sitcoms, Who's the Boss?, Growing Pains (both of which had been comprising the Saturday 8:00–9:00 p.m. block since September 1991) and Perfect Strangers (which was still highly rated, but moved to Saturday to help the declining ratings of Boss and Pains). The newcomer that rounded out the lineup was the Steven Bochco cartoon Capitol Critters. Premiering on February 1, 1992, the two-hour comedy block of I Love Saturday Night coincided with The Young Riders, which had been airing Saturdays in the 9:00 p.m. Eastern hour, going on a three-month hiatus. Freshman dramedy The Commish, meanwhile, remained at 10:00 p.m. Eastern.

I Love Saturday Night was structured exactly like TGIF, with hosts from each show rotating every week, down to its own set of branding graphics and a theme song. The intro to the lineup began with a red ABC logo encased inside an animated heart, which bounced around, and then off, the screen. Set against various-colored backgrounds (but most commonly blue), the lineup's title was then spelled out in the opening alongside views of animated suns, moons and palm trees. The theme song itself – with the lyrics S-A-T-U-R-D-A-Y../ Saturday Night! / I Love Saturday / Saturday Night – even had a calypso sound to it, with Jamaican-style male vocals. The last two lines of the theme were often sung over the show bumpers that led into the last commercial break of each show.

The I Love Saturday Night lineup received heavy promotion, as ABC was valiantly trying to achieve any remaining life out of Who's the Boss? and Growing Pains especially. Those in the industry suspected that Perfect Strangers was moved to Saturdays not necessarily since it could have bolstered the lineup's performance, but because it was part of an ABC agenda to kill the series (ABC's explanation in its move from Fridays was that it did not fit the new TGIF demographic, ages 10–18). Saturday night on ABC, especially up against NBC's powerhouse lineup of the evening, seemed a surefire place to send even a popular show into considerable ratings decline. This is exactly what happened, as ratings during the entire February sweeps period were the lowest of the season for ABC that night (save for The Commish, which had become successful in its first season), with Perfect Strangers experiencing the largest single-season ratings decline for a series. After five dismal weeks in the Nielsens, ABC had a rapid loss of faith in I Love Saturday Night; the branding concept for the Saturday lineup was used for the last time on February 29, 1992.

Cast members from all three of the live-action shows hosted I Love Saturday Night in rotation during the five-week run:
 February 1, 1992: Mark-Linn Baker and Bronson Pinchot, Perfect Strangers
 February 8, 1992: Kirk Cameron, Jeremy Miller and Leonardo DiCaprio, Growing Pains
 February 15, 1992: Tony Danza and Judith Light, Who's the Boss?
 February 22, 1992:† Mark-Linn Baker and Bronson Pinchot, Perfect Strangers
 February 29, 1992: Kirk Cameron, Jeremy Miller, Ashley Johnson and Leonardo DiCaprio, Growing Pains

† Capital Critters and Perfect Strangers did not air on this night, although Pinchot and Linn-Baker did host. The Jaleel White Special aired from 8:00 to 9:00 p.m., followed by Who's the Boss? at 9:00 and Growing Pains in its regular 9:30 slot.

Beyond the quick demise of I Love Saturday Night, the same lineup, more or less, continued on ABC for the remainder of the 1991–92 season. Capital Critters was cancelled in March; this caused the remaining three shows to switch slots in order to provide a choice time period for the Head of the Class spinoff Billy, which moved to the lineup (Billy had previously been a part of TGIF from its January 31, 1992 premiere until March). Boss and Pains, meanwhile, had announced the end of their runs in the spring of 1992, but both would remain on Saturdays until summer reruns. These shows aired their one-hour finales on Saturday, April 25, 1992, along with the series finale of MacGyver, which aired on this night for one week only. Both Perfect Strangers and Billy would remain part of the lineup after Boss and Pains relocated.

Two new sitcoms premiered on Saturdays that spring and summer: Julie, starring Julie Andrews (with a future TGIF star, eventual Boy Meets World cast member Rider Strong, as Andrews's stepson), and the David Lynch-produced comedy On the Air. The failure of these programs, along with ABC's decision to not renew Billy for a second season and the announcement that Perfect Strangers was going on a long hiatus, marked the end of any attempt by ABC to program comedies or family fare on that night. (The Commish would run for four additional seasons, ending in January 1996.) Once every few years, ABC would again try to program such shows on Saturday nights with no success. The lone exception in this case was The Wonderful World of Disney, which ABC revived after it was bought by Disney and eventually moved to Saturday nights in 2003, where it ran until it was discontinued in 2008.

Special events
On November 23, 1995, ABC scheduled a music special for The Beatles Anthology. To promote the special on the previous Friday (November 17), the respective opening theme songs for all of the TGIF sitcoms were replaced with Beatles songs, regardless of the individual shows' plot with the exception of Boy Meets World, which used a song by The Monkees as its theme that week (as the episode featured a guest appearance by the group's members).

On November 7, 1997, all four TGIF shows that night had a storyline (TGIF Time Machine, "Time Goes Insane Friday") in which Salem from Sabrina the Teenage Witch (voiced by Nick Bakay) caused the characters in each show to travel back to a different point in time – the result of the warlock-turned-anthropomorphic cat having swallowed a "time ball". On an episode of Boy Meets World aired the previous week (October 31), Melissa Joan Hart made a second cameo, as an aside, due to the episode in question ("The Witches of Pennbrook") featuring a plot involving a coven of witches being thwarted from taking the soul of supporting main character Jack Hunter (played by Matthew Lawrence); the cameo featured fellow main character Eric Matthews (Will Friedle) describing the event and swearing off witches, not realizing that Sabrina is one.

Musical group Hanson hosted TGIF on November 28, 1997 (during Thanksgiving weekend) as a tie-in to their half-hour music special Meet Hanson. Between each show and leading up to the special’s 9:30 p.m. ET broadcast, segments showed the group in the studio, "commanding" the shows to come on, and at one point even incorporating TGIF into their mega-hit song "MMMBop".

Change/End of Original TGIF (1996–2000)
The Walt Disney Company purchased ABC corporate parent Capital Cities Communications in September 1995, and, after finalizing the sale the following year, began reshaping the network to its preferences beginning in 1996, refocusing its attention towards programming toward teenagers and adult audiences. After a couple years with nearly the exact same lineup, ABC finally changed up its Friday night lineup to jump start the fading TGIF by holding Step by Step and Hangin' with Mr. Cooper on the backburner (until the Spring of 1997) and launching two new shows that were bookended by popular veterans Family Matters and Boy Meets World.

The first was Sabrina the Teenage Witch, a fantasy sitcom based on the Archie comic book character that starred Melissa Joan Hart, who had made her name earlier in the 1990s as the star of Nickelodeon's Clarissa Explains It All. Becoming a breakout hit out of the gate, it was ABC's most successful Friday comedy launch since Boy Meets World debuted three years earlier in September 1993 and helped breathe new life into the lineup. With its mix of supernatural and conventional teen sitcom elements, Sabrina was a buzzy show among ABC's target audience for the night and fit nicely with the lineup's other teen-centered shows. The second new show was Clueless, which was based on and created by the writer/director of the 1995 teen comedy film of the same name and starring many of the same cast members (albeit with Rachel Blanchard and Michael Lerner replacing Alicia Silverstone and Dan Hedaya in the roles of lead character Cher Horowitz and her widowed attorney father, Mel). Clueless was the more anticipated show among ABC's two new Friday comedies, though, despite pulling reasonable ratings, it was not as successful as Sabrina the Teenage Witch was. ABC pulled the series in February 1997, and cancelled it at the end of the 1996–97 season. (Clueless would subsequently be picked up by UPN, where it would run for two more seasons.) Step by Step took over Cluelesss timeslot when it returned for its 24-episode sixth season in March; the abbreviated fifth (and final) season of Hangin' with Mr. Cooper, however, was pushed to June and burned off all 13 episodes on Saturday nights.

As a result of the overhaul to cater to a new audience, longtime TGIF staples Family Matters and Step by Step – both of which had been experiencing steadily declining ratings for the past few seasons – were cancelled. The former two would be revived by CBS, where they would serve as the linchpins for a new, competing block airing on the same night, the CBS Block Party. (Because ABC chose to delay its sixth season to accommodate Sabrina and Clueless on the TGIF lineup, the seventh [and final] season of Step by Step premiered on CBS only five weeks after its sixth season finale, the show’s final original ABC broadcast, aired on August 15.) That block, which aired during the 1997–98 season, failed with both the lineup and all four of its shows (including The Gregory Hines Show and another Miller-Boyett series that joined Family Matters and Step by Step, the Bronson Pinchot vehicle Meego) only lasting one season.

The success of Sabrina the Teenage Witch prompted ABC to surround it and Boy Meets World with other supernatural-themed shows as part of "the new TGIF"  for the 1997–98 season. The two sitcoms containing such elements added to replace Family Matters and Step by Step were You Wish, a series from Boy Meets World creator/showrunner Michael Jacobs about a genie living with a family; and Teen Angel, centering on a teenager who died during an eating challenge and returns to Earth as his best friend's guardian angel. Neither show was as endearing with audiences as the TGIF shows that earned long runs in previous years, and were also disliked by critics, even with the return of Maureen McCormick (formerly Marcia Brady) and the addition of established sitcom star Jerry Van Dyke (who, unusually, had supporting roles on both new shows) to the network's Friday night lineup.

The TGIF lineup began to experience sagging ratings throughout 1997–98 in part due to the audience fracture caused by its new competition from CBSs Block Party, which was enough to hurt TGIF even though the rival block itself was a failure. Even Boy Meets World and Sabrina the Teenage Witch started to experience declining ratings due to strong competition from Dateline NBC and two successful replacements to the ill-fated CBS Block Party, Kids Say the Darndest Things and Candid Camera; with the more formidable competition, after eight years, ABC was no longer the top network on Friday nights. Although You Wish and Teen Angel were designed in concept to mesh with Sabrina on the lineup, both lasted only a season (or less) before being cancelled by the network: You Wish was pulled in November, while Teen Angel lasted until February. Save for a two-week run of the more adult-oriented comedy Hiller and Diller, ABC simply aired repeats of Sabrina the Teenage Witch and Boy Meets World for the rest of that season (at 8:00 and 9:30 p.m. respectively, leading into new episodes of those series). As part of a network-wide rebranding toward a simplified graphics package, ABC retired the traditional TGIF logo and phased out the theme song.

After a moribund 1997–98 season, the 1998–99 season saw two promising shows in Two of a Kind, a starring vehicle for Mary-Kate and Ashley Olsen centering on a widowed college professor who hires one of his students to help take care of his twin daughters, and Brother's Keeper, an "Odd Couple"-style sitcom centering on a widowed college history professor who agrees to let his irresponsible pro-football player brother move in with him and his son (per a stipulation in his brother's contract with the San Francisco 49ers). The network thought that the return of the Olsen twins to ABC would help boost the block's foundering ratings, and decided to place Two of a Kind in the 8:00 p.m. slot to lead off the block. Both shows had respectable ratings throughout the season, although viewership for Two of a Kind gradually declined as the season progressed after a promising start; however, it and Brother's Keeper were both cancelled in May 1999, marking the second season in a row that the block failed to generate a hit among its freshman shows. The cancellation of Two of a Kind—which was the last series to be produced by the studio until the 2016 debut of Full House reboot Fuller House—also marked the end of ABC’s 27-year relationship with Miller-Boyett Productions and its various iterations. (Two of a Kind and Meego were the only series produced under the Miller-Boyett-Warren partnership formed the previous year that saw longtime collaborator Michael Warren join the company as co-partner.) With the block continuing to struggle to generate new hits and ratings for Boy Meets World and Sabrina the Teenage Witch continuing to fall, it seemed that the end of the original TGIF was in sight.

What would become the final season (1999–2000) of TGIFs original run saw additional changes: the hosting segments and skits were officially dropped, the TGIF name was only used for the promos and bumpers (becoming an unnamed block on Friday's), sophomore series The Hughleys moved from Tuesdays to Fridays, while the new comedy Odd Man Out (a vehicle for then-rising teen actor Erik Von Detten) joined the lineup aftered being heavily promoted in the summer of 1999 as a last ditch effort to save the dying block. In March, ABC launched the reality music competition series Making the Band (acting as a mid-season replacement for Odd Man Out) in the midst of the late 1990s–early 2000s boy band craze. The show featured boy-band impresario and eventual convict Lou Pearlman putting together a new boy band that became O-Town, which would go on to have a couple of successful songs. All four sitcoms that ABC aired on Fridays that season experienced varied fates: Sabrina the Teenage Witch and The Hughleys were both cancelled by the network and revived by The WB and UPN, respectively; Boy Meets World voluntarily ended its run after seven successful seasons; and Odd Man Out was cancelled outright by January 2000.

The final night of new programming was on May 5, 2000: that evening featured the hour-long series finale of Boy Meets World, followed by what was billed as "ABC's series finale" of Sabrina the Teenage Witch (as it had just been picked up by The WB), which aired as a two-episode block consisting of the series’ fourth season finale—the final original episode of Sabrina to air on the network—and a repeat episode. Repeats of both series continued throughout the summer, with repeats of Sabrina the Teenage Witch continuing to air until August 25, and repeats of Boy Meets World continuing until September 8, 2000 (when ABC aired the first and only original network rerun of that show's series finale) along with the finale of Making the Band (which was later revived on MTV in 2002, following its cancellation by ABC). ABC retired the "TGIF" brand shortly thereafter.

Post-TGIF (2000–2002) 
In September 2000, ABC relaunched its Friday sitcom block under the Working Comedy banner for the 2000–01 season: the block featured fading comedies Two Guys and a Girl and Norm, and freshman sitcoms The Trouble With Normal and Madigan Men, which underperformed. This lineup only lasted one year, with all four shows being cancelled by the end of the season (The Trouble with Normal lasted only five episodes; its replacement, the found-humor filler Dot Comedy, was pulled after only one). ABC then opted to running dramas and reality shows such as The Mole (which only lasted three weeks). By then, Friday nights were the second-weakest night of the week for television viewership (behind Saturdays), with only a few shows receiving attention, such as CBS's CSI: Crime Scene Investigation, which premiered on Friday (in contrast to the other major broadcast networks, CBS has maintained strong ratings for its Friday evening programming for the most part since then). This meant that for the first time since the 1988-1989 television season, ABC promoted Friday night lineups in a standard fashion between 2001 and 2003.

In the summer of 2001, Disney acquired Fox Family from News Corporation and Saban Entertainment, renaming the channel ABC Family. Disney head Michael Eisner hoped to use ABC Family to repurpose ABC network shows. To meet that end, he decided to revive the TGIF block on ABC Family to create additional revenue for ABC's family sitcoms. This effort hit a roadblock due to the fact that ABC did not own the syndication rights to all of its programs. As such, the "new" ABC Family TGIF block, which debuted on March 1, 2002, consisted of the recently acquired dramedy State of Grace, in addition to reruns of ABC's According to Jim and, unusual for what was meant to be a sitcom block, repeats of the drama Alias. Due to poor advertising sales, complaints from ABC affiliates, and show producers concerned that the new block would hurt syndication revenue, ABC Family's TGIF was pulled after a few short weeks.

Second run (2003–2005) 
TGIF returned to ABC on September 26, 2003; the relaunched block received heavy promotion in advance, including a promo spot employing the Village People pop tune "YMCA" (sung as "T-G-I-F"), featuring all the casts of all four family comedies seated on a living-room couch. The initial lineup for the revived TGIF featured returning comedies George Lopez and Life with Bonnie, and freshmen series Married to the Kellys and Hope & Faith (the latter serving as a starring vehicle for Kelly Ripa). That season's lineup met with only moderate success, seeing a consistent second- or third-place showing against a popular CBS drama lineup that included Joan of Arcadia and JAG.

Alex Trebek briefly served as host and spokesman for the block, but for the majority of the TGIF revival, the block aired without a host – thereby differing from the concept of the original 1989 to 2000 version. Hope & Faith was the only show from the previous season that remained on the Friday lineup for the 2004–05 season (George Lopez was moved to ABC's Tuesday comedy block, before being shifted back to its original night of Wednesday; while Life with Bonnie and Married to the Kellys were both cancelled), with 8 Simple Rules moving from Tuesdays to anchor the lineup, joined by freshman comedy Complete Savages and returning workplace sitcom Less Than Perfect (transplanted from Wednesdays).

By early 2005, ABC had stopped actively promoting the TGIF name. The network discontinued the TGIF block for the second time on September 16, 2005; this came despite CBS's cancellations of both Joan and JAG in May 2005. For the 2005–06 season, Hope & Faith continued to air on Friday nights (before moving to Tuesdays, where it ended its run after three seasons amid low ratings opposite Fox powerhouse American Idol), while Less Than Perfect was renewed as a midseason replacement (returning in April 2006, joining Hope & Faith on Tuesdays, where it met the same fate).

Post-2005
In recent years, Friday nights on ABC have been primarily used to air reality programs (such as Shark Tank), occasional encores of the network's dramas and comedies, and ABC News human interest programming (such as Primetime: What Would You Do?). 20/20 remains a stalwart of the Friday night schedule to end the evening.

Those TGIF series that had reached, or come close to, the 100 episodes necessary to be syndicated were offered to local stations for a time period, after which they were sold to cable channels. Disney Channel aired re-runs of Boy Meets World from 2000 to 2007 and briefly in 2014 (with select episodes from later seasons – particularly, seasons 5-7 – being edited and three other episodes being banned altogether due to mature subject matter) – the latter instance was part of a programming stunt to promote its sequel series, Girl Meets World, focusing on the children of the earlier sitcom's principal characters Cory Matthews and Topanga Lawrence-Matthews (and airing in the same Friday night time slot as its predecessor). ABC and Disney Channel sister network ABC Family has rebroadcast episodes of Boy Meets World (2004–2007 and since April 2010), Full House (2003–2012, and briefly during 2013), Step by Step (2001–2010), Family Matters (2003–2009), Sabrina, the Teenage Witch (2007–2011) and 8 Simple Rules (2007–2014).

MTV2 also airs Boy Meets World (since 2011) through a separate syndication deal; since 2016, it has shared its rights to Boy Meets World with TeenNick, which uses the series as a lead-in to its own 1990s block, The Splat. Nick at Nite has aired Full House (2003–2009, 2010–2011 and 2012-2021), Family Matters (2009–2013) and Hangin' with Mr. Cooper (2014–2015). Ion Television, before its transition to a lineup of all dramas, ran Perfect Strangers (only during October 2007) and Hangin' with Mr. Cooper (2007–2008). Prior to its replacement by Discovery Family in October 2014, the Hub Network also aired Step by Step and Sister, Sister (which only spent a brief portion of its original ABC run as part of the TGIF block) for several months that year.

On July 27, 2017, Hulu and Warner Bros. Television (whose parent company owns a 10% share of the service through Turner Broadcasting System) announced that Hulu would acquire the digital rights to the library of series owned by Warner, that originally aired on the block; this includes the block's most popular shows, such as Family Matters, Full House, Perfect Strangers, and Hangin' with Mr. Cooper. Notable shows not included are Sabrina the Teenage Witch (owned by CBS Television Distribution) and Dinosaurs and Boy Meets World (both owned by Disney-ABC Home Entertainment & Television Distribution).

Return of comedy to Friday nights (2012–2017)
On May 15, 2012 (during the upfronts unveiling its 2012–13 schedule), ABC announced the return of family-oriented comedies to its Friday night schedule starting that November, by pairing Last Man Standing and freshman sitcom Malibu Country together from 8:00 to 9:00 p.m. Eastern Time, along with returning shows Shark Tank and 20/20. The TGIF name was not revived, however, with the hour being advertised as ABC Comedy Friday for that season. Happy Endings moved to the 8:00 p.m. hour (with back-to-back original episodes) on Fridays on March 29 after Last Man Standing and Malibu Country ended their respective seasons; that move was effectively criticized as a burn-off maneuver due to both the double-episode scheduling and ABC choosing not to renew Happy Endings (which had been suffering from declining ratings in its previous Tuesday slot earlier that season) for a fourth season two months later.

Due partly to the continued strength of Shark Tank and 20/20 (and to a somewhat lesser degree, Last Man Standing), ABC became a challenger for CBS's usual dominance on Friday nights starting with the 2012–13 season. However, the successes of Last Man Standing and Shark Tank on in their respective Friday slots did not do much to help shore up ratings for the comedies slotted between them in the 8:30 p.m. Eastern time slot, all of which struggled and were eventually cancelled. The one-hour family comedy block returned for the 2013–14 season, with sophomore series The Neighbors joining Last Man Standing, where the former floundered. Another freshman comedy, Cristela (a starring vehicle for co-creator Cristela Alonzo), joined Last Man Standing on Fridays for the 2014–15 season, only to also be cancelled after the conclusion of its first season. Yet another sitcom, Dr. Ken (a star vehicle for former doctor turned stand-up comic Ken Jeong), joined Last Man Standing on the block for the 2015–16 season. (Of the four sitcoms paired with Last Man Standing on Fridays, Dr. Ken was the only series that returned for an additional season, getting a second season renewal for the 2016–17 season.)

Both Dr. Ken and Last Man Standing were canceled in May 2017, with their Friday stablemate Shark Tank being moved to Sundays for the 2017–18 fall season. The changes culminated in ABC choosing to revamp its Friday night lineup – despite continued strong ratings for Last Man Standing and Shark Tank in their respective slots – to focus on drama series, with ABC filling the first two hours of its Friday lineup with returning series Once Upon a Time and freshman Marvel superhero drama Inhumans for the 2017–18 season. (In the case of Last Man Standing, its cancellation was cited as being due to the expiration of a contract between 20th Century Fox Television and ABC, in which 20th Century Fox Television covered the show's production costs, after ABC declined to negotiate license fees to prevent it from having to handle production costs going forward.)

TGIT (2014–2018)
ABC paid homage to the TGIF phrase and branding when it began marketing its Thursday night lineup for the 2014–15 season, consisting entirely of dramas created by Shonda Rhimes (Grey's Anatomy, Scandal and freshman drama How to Get Away with Murder), as "TGIT" (Thank God It's Thursday); other than the similarity in name and both airing on the same network, the two blocks are in no way related, and due to their completely divergent parental ratings, meant for different audiences. Station 19 joined TGIT when that show premiered in 2018.

Third run (2018–2019) 
After experiencing mediocre ratings on Fridays, ABC made several programming moves that resulted in the discontinuance of its Friday drama block after one season. In February 2018, ABC announced that Once Upon a Time (which had been experiencing declining viewership throughout its run, with its most noted declines taking place since its fifth season) would end after seven seasons. That May, the network cancelled Inhumans after one season, while giving another Marvel series, Agents of S.H.I.E.L.D. (which replaced Inhumans for the 2018 midseason), a sixth season renewal for the network's summer 2019 schedule.

For its 2018-2019 schedule, ABC announced it bring back comedies to the Friday night slot, with the lineup consisting of returning family sitcoms Fresh Off the Boat and Speechless, along with the game show Child Support (which experienced decent viewership for its inaugural season in the winter of early 2018). In July 2018, ABC confirmed that the block would reinstate the "TGIF" name when the lineup debuts on October 5. Unlike the previous incarnations, the block will only consist of an hour of sitcoms, as Child Support (which maintains some comedic elements) will occupy the 9:00 p.m. hour. The first promo debuted during Fresh off the Boat on August 10, 2018, featuring new graphics and using an updated version of the 1994–96 variant of the block's original theme. In a twist, Last Man Standing – which was picked up by Fox for a seventh season after a one-year sabbatical – competed against the "TGIF" block, leading off an hour-long comedy block (Fox's first attempt at airing sitcoms on Fridays since a short-lived effort in the fall of 2009) called FOX Funny Friday, airing in the same time slot that ABC carried it for most of its original run. For its season premiere, the child casts from Fresh of the Boat and Speechless hosted the lineup: the segments were in the middle of the shows, including the outro.

For the 2019 season, the block was reduced to one hour, as 20/20 has made its new two-hour format permanent. In September 2019, the TGIF name was once again retired, no longer being mentioned in promos and bumpers, with the block being referred as to "ABC Friday Night;" the remaining sitcoms were dropped by spring 2020 in favor of the returning Shark Tank.

TGIF lineup history

Steve Urkel crossovers
Steve Urkel of Family Matters made crossover appearances on two other TGIF programs.
January 25, 1991: Full House Season 4, Episode 16: "Stephanie Gets Framed"
September 27, 1991: Step by Step Season 1, Episode 2: "The Dance"

References

External links
 

Television programming blocks in the United States